Judith Biros Robson (born 1939) is a retired American nurse, nursing instructor, and Democratic politician.  She served 12 years in the Wisconsin State Senate and 12 years in the Wisconsin State Assembly, representing Rock County.  She was the first female Democratic State Senate majority leader in Wisconsin history.

Biography
Robson was born in Cleveland, Ohio, and now lives in Beloit, Wisconsin.  She received a B.S.N. degree from St. John's College in Cleveland, and a master's degree from the University of Wisconsin–Madison in 1976. She is a registered nurse. Before being elected to public office, Robson worked as a nurse and as an instructor, primarily at Blackhawk Technical College.

Robson was elected to the Wisconsin Assembly in June 1987 in a special election to replace Timothy Weeden (who had been elected to the State Senate). She was reelected to her seat several times and served in that house until 1999. In 1998, she was elected to the State Senate and reelected in 2002. Robson was selected by her peers to be the State Senate Democratic Leader in 2005. She was reelected in 2006 and became the Majority Leader of the Wisconsin State Senate in 2007 following the Democratic takeover of the State Senate in the 2006 elections. The day after passage of the 2007-2008 state budget, the Senate Democratic Caucus elected Russ Decker to replace Robson as Majority Leader.

Robson did not seek reelection in 2010 and was succeeded by Timothy Cullen, who had held the senate seat prior to Tim Weeden.

Committee assignments
 Committee for review of Administrative Rules
 Joint committee for review of Administrative Rules
 Committee on Education, Ethics and Elections
 Committee on Health, Children, Families, Aging and Long Term Care
 Special Committee on Improving Wisconsin's Fiscal Management
 Special Committee on The Public Health System's Response to Terrorism and Public Health Emergencies (chair)
 Wisconsin Artistic Endowment Foundation
 Women's Council

Further reading

References

External links
 
Wisconsin State Legislature - Senator Judy Robson official WI Senate website
Project Vote Smart - Senator Judith Biros 'Judy' Robson (WI) profile
Follow the Money - Judy Robson
2006 2004 2002 2000 1998 campaign contributions
Wisconsin Democracy Campaign - Judy Robson campaign contributions

1939 births
American women nurses
Living people
Members of the Wisconsin State Assembly
Politicians from Beloit, Wisconsin
Politicians from Cleveland
University of Wisconsin–Madison School of Nursing alumni
Wisconsin state senators
Women state legislators in Wisconsin
21st-century American politicians
21st-century American women politicians